James Augustine Aloysius Joyce (2 February 1882 – 13 January 1941) was an Irish novelist, poet, and literary critic. He contributed to the modernist avant-garde movement and is regarded as one of the most influential and important writers of the 20th century. Joyce's novel Ulysses (1922) is a landmark in which the episodes of Homer's Odyssey are paralleled in a variety of literary styles, particularly stream of consciousness. Other well-known works are the short-story collection Dubliners (1914), and the novels A Portrait of the Artist as a Young Man (1916) and Finnegans Wake (1939). His other writings include three books of poetry, a play, letters, and occasional journalism.

Joyce was born in Dublin into a middle-class family. He attended the Jesuit Clongowes Wood College in County Kildare, then, briefly, the Christian Brothers-run O'Connell School. Despite the chaotic family life imposed by his father's unpredictable finances, he excelled at the Jesuit Belvedere College and graduated from University College Dublin in 1902. In 1904, he met his future wife, Nora Barnacle, and they moved to mainland Europe. He briefly worked in Pula and then moved to Trieste in Austria-Hungary, working as an English instructor. Except for an eight-month stay in Rome working as a correspondence clerk and three visits to Dublin, Joyce resided there until 1915. In Trieste, he published his book of poems Chamber Music and his short story collection Dubliners, and he began serially publishing A Portrait of the Artist as a Young Man in the English magazine The Egoist. During most of World War I, Joyce lived in Zürich, Switzerland, and worked on Ulysses. After the war, he briefly returned to Trieste and then moved to Paris in 1920, which became his primary residence until 1940.

Ulysses was first published in Paris in 1922, but its publication in the United Kingdom and the United States was prohibited because of its perceived obscenity. Copies were smuggled into both countries and pirated versions were printed until the mid-1930s, when publication finally became legal. Joyce started his next major work, Finnegans Wake, in 1923, publishing it sixteen years later in 1939. Between these years, Joyce travelled widely. He and Nora were married in a civil ceremony in London in 1930. He made a number of trips to Switzerland, frequently seeking treatment for his increasingly severe eye problems and psychological help for his daughter, Lucia. When France was occupied by Germany during World War II, Joyce moved back to Zürich in 1940. He died there in 1941 after surgery for a perforated ulcer, less than one month before his 59th birthday.

Ulysses frequently ranks high in lists of great books of literature, and the academic literature analysing his work is extensive and ongoing. Many writers, film-makers, and other artists have been influenced by his stylistic innovations, such as his meticulous attention to detail, use of interior monologue, wordplay, and the radical transformation of traditional plot and character development. Though most of his adult life was spent abroad, his fictional universe centres on Dublin and is largely populated by characters who closely resemble family members, enemies and friends from his time there. Ulysses in particular is set in the streets and alleyways of the city. Joyce is quoted as saying, "For myself, I always write about Dublin, because if I can get to the heart of Dublin I can get to the heart of all the cities of the world. In the particular is contained the universal."

Early life

Joyce was born on 2 February 1882 at 41 Brighton Square, Rathgar, Dublin, Ireland, to John Stanislaus Joyce and Mary Jane "May" ( Murray). He was the eldest of ten surviving siblings. He was baptised with the name James Augustine Joyce according to the rites of the Roman Catholic Church in the nearby St Joseph's Church in Terenure on 5 February 1882 by Rev. John O'Mulloy. His godparents were Philip and Ellen McCann. John Stanislaus Joyce's family came from Fermoy in County Cork, where they owned a small salt and lime works. Joyce's paternal grandfather, James Augustine, married Ellen O'Connell, daughter of John O'Connell, a Cork alderman who owned a drapery business and other properties in Cork City. Ellen's family claimed kinship with the political leader Daniel O'Connell, who had helped secure Catholic emancipation for the Irish in 1829. The Joyce family's purported ancestor, Seán Mór Seoighe was a stonemason from Connemara.

Joyce's father was appointed rate collector by Dublin Corporation in 1887. The family moved to the fashionable small town of Bray,  from Dublin. Joyce was attacked by a dog around this time, leading to his lifelong fear of dogs. He later developed a fear of thunderstorms, which he acquired through a superstitious aunt who had described them as a sign of God's wrath.

In 1891, nine-year-old Joyce wrote the poem "Et Tu, Healy" on the death of Charles Stewart Parnell that his father printed and distributed to friends. The poem expressed the sentiments of the elder Joyce, who was angry at Parnell's apparent betrayal by the Irish Catholic Church, the Irish Parliamentary Party, and the British Liberal Party that resulted in a collaborative failure to secure Irish Home Rule in the British Parliament. This sense of betrayal, particularly by the church, left a lasting impression that Joyce expressed in his life and art.

That year, his family began to slide into poverty, worsened by his father's drinking and financial mismanagement. John Joyce's name was published in Stubbs' Gazette, a blacklist of debtors and bankrupts, in November 1891, and he was temporarily suspended from work. In January 1893, he was dismissed with a reduced pension.

Joyce began his education in 1888 at Clongowes Wood College, a Jesuit boarding school near Clane, County Kildare, but had to leave in 1891 when his father could no longer pay the fees. He studied at home and briefly attended the Christian Brothers O'Connell School on North Richmond Street, Dublin. Joyce's father then had a chance meeting with the Jesuit priest John Conmee, who knew the family. Conmee arranged for Joyce and his brother Stanislaus to attend the Jesuits' Dublin school, Belvedere College, without fees starting in 1893. In 1895, Joyce, now aged 13, was elected by his peers to join the Sodality of Our Lady. Joyce spent five years at Belvedere, his intellectual formation guided by the principles of Jesuit education laid down in the Ratio Studiorum (Plan of Studies). He displayed his writing talent by winning first place for English composition in his final two years before graduating in 1898.

University years

Joyce enrolled at University College in 1898 to study English, French and Italian. While there, he was exposed to the scholasticism of Thomas Aquinas, which had a strong influence on his thought for the rest of his life. He participated in many of Dublin's theatrical and literary circles. His closest colleagues included leading Irish figures of his generation, most notably, George Clancy, Tom Kettle and Francis Sheehy-Skeffington. Many of the acquaintances he made at this time appeared in his work. His first publication—
a laudatory review of Henrik Ibsen's When We Dead Awaken—was printed in The Fortnightly Review in 1900. Inspired by Ibsen's works, Joyce sent him a fan letter in Norwegian and wrote a play, A Brilliant Career, which he later destroyed.

In 1901 the National Census of Ireland listed Joyce as a 19-year-old Irish- and English-speaking unmarried student living with his parents, six sisters and three brothers at Royal Terrace (now Inverness Road) in Clontarf, Dublin. During this year he became friends with Oliver St. John Gogarty, the model for Buck Mulligan in Ulysses. In November, Joyce wrote an article, The Day of the Rabblement, criticising the Irish Literary Theatre for its unwillingness to produce the works of playwrights like Ibsen, Leo Tolstoy, and Gerhart Hauptmann. He protested against nostalgic Irish populism and argued for an outward-looking, cosmopolitan literature. Because he mentioned Gabriele D'Annunzio's novel,  (The Flame), which was on the Roman Catholic list of prohibited books, his college magazine refused to print it. Joyce and Sheehy-Skeffington—who had also had an article rejected—had their essays jointly printed and distributed. Arthur Griffith decried the censorship of Joyce's work in his newspaper United Irishman.

Joyce graduated from the Royal University of Ireland in October 1902. He considered studying medicine and began attending lectures at the Catholic University Medical School in Dublin. When the medical school refused to provide a tutoring position to help finance his education, he left Dublin to study medicine in Paris, where he received permission to attend the course for a certificate in physics, chemistry, and biology at the École de Médecine. By the end of January 1903, he had given up plans to study medicine 
but he stayed in Paris, often reading late in the Bibliothèque Sainte-Geneviève. He frequently wrote home claiming ill health due to the water, the cold weather, and his change of diet, appealing for money his family could ill-afford.

Post-university years in Dublin

In April 1903, Joyce learned his mother was dying and immediately returned to Ireland. He would tend to her, reading aloud from drafts that would eventually be worked into his unfinished novel Stephen Hero. During her final days, she unsuccessfully tried to get him to make his confession and to take communion. She died on 13 August. Afterwards, Joyce and Stanislaus refused to kneel with other members of the family praying at her bedside. John Joyce's drinking and abusiveness increased in the months following her death, and the family began to fall apart. Joyce spent much of his time carousing with Gogarty and his medical school colleagues, and tried to scrape together a living by reviewing books.

Joyce's life began to change when he met Nora Barnacle on 10 June 1904. She was a twenty-year-old woman from Galway city, who was working in Dublin as a chambermaid. They had their first outing together on 16 June 1904, walking through the Dublin suburb of Ringsend, where Nora masturbated him. This event was commemorated as the date for the action of Ulysses, known in popular culture as "Bloomsday" in honour of the novel's main character Leopold Bloom. This began a relationship that continued for thirty-seven years until Joyce died. Soon after this outing, Joyce, who had been carousing with his colleagues, approached a young woman in St Stephen's Green and was beaten up by her companion. He was picked up and dusted off by an acquaintance of his father's, Alfred H. Hunter, who took him into his home to tend to his injuries. Hunter, who was rumoured to be a Jew and to have an unfaithful wife, became one of the models for Leopold Bloom, the protagonist of Ulysses.

Joyce was a talented tenor and explored becoming a musical performer. On 8 May 1904, he was a contestant in the Feis Ceoil, an Irish music competition for promising composers, instrumentalists and singers. In the months before the contest, Joyce took singing lessons with two voice instructors, Benedetto Palmieri and Vincent O'Brien. He paid the entry fee by pawning some of his books. For the contest, Joyce had to sing three songs. He did well with the first two, but when he was told he had to sight read the third, he refused. Joyce won the third-place medal anyway. After the contest, Palmieri wrote Joyce that Luigi Denza, the composer of the popular song Funiculì, Funiculà who was the judge for the contest, spoke highly of his voice and would have given him first place but for the sight-reading and lack of sufficient training. Palmieri even offered to give Joyce free singing lessons afterwards. Joyce refused the lessons, but kept singing in Dublin concerts that year. His performance at a concert given on 27 August may have solidified Nora's devotion to him.

Throughout 1904, Joyce sought to develop his literary reputation. On 7 January he attempted to publish a prose work examining aesthetics called A Portrait of the Artist, but it was rejected by the intellectual journal Dana. He then reworked it into a fictional novel of his youth that he called Stephen Hero that he labored over for years but eventually abandoned. He wrote a satirical poem called "The Holy Office", which parodied William Butler Yeats's poem "To Ireland in the Coming Times" and once more mocked the Irish Literary Revival. It too was rejected for publication; this time for being "unholy". He wrote the collection of poems Chamber Music at this time; which was also rejected. He did publish three poems, one in Dana  and two in The Speaker, and George William Russell published three of Joyce's short stories in the Irish Homestead. These stories—"The Sisters", "Eveline", and "After the Race"—were the beginnings of Dubliners.

In September 1904, Joyce was having difficulties finding a place to live and moved into a Martello tower near Dublin, which Gogarty was renting.
Within a week, Joyce left when Gogarty and another roommate, Dermot Chenevix Trench, fired a pistol in the middle of the night at some pans hanging directly over Joyce's bed. With the help of funds from Lady Gregory and a few other acquaintances, Joyce and Nora left Ireland less than a month later.

1904–1906: Zürich, Pula and Trieste

Zürich and Pula
In October 1904, Joyce and Nora went into self-imposed exile. They briefly stopped in London and Paris to secure funds before heading on to Zürich.
Joyce had been informed through an agent in England that there was a vacancy at the Berlitz Language School there, but when he arrived there was no position. The couple stayed in Zürich for a little over a week. The director of the school sent Joyce on to Trieste, which was part of the Austro-Hungarian Empire until the First World War. There was no vacancy there either. The director of the school in Trieste, Almidano Artifoni, secured a position for him in Pola, then Austria-Hungary's major naval base, where he mainly taught English to naval officers. Less than one month after the couple had left Ireland, Nora had already become pregnant. Joyce soon became close friends with Alessandro Francini Bruni, the director of the school at Pola, and his wife Clothilde. By the beginning of 1905, both families were living together. Joyce kept writing when he could. He completed a short story for Dubliners, "Clay", and worked on his novel Stephen Hero. He disliked Pola, calling it a "back-of-God-speed place—a naval Siberia", and soon as a job became available, he went to Trieste.

First stay in Trieste
When 23 year-old Joyce first moved to Trieste in March 1905, he immediately started teaching English at the Berlitz school. By June, Joyce felt financially secure enough to have his satirical poem "Holy Office" printed and asked Stanislaus to distribute copies to his former associates in Dublin.
After Nora gave birth to their first child, Giorgio, on 27 July 1905, Joyce convinced Stanislaus to move to Trieste and got a position for him at the Berlitz school. Stanislaus moved in with Joyce as soon as he arrived in October, and most of his salary went directly to supporting Joyce's family. In February 1906, the Joyce household once more shared an apartment with the Francini Brunis.

Joyce kept writing despite all these changes. He completed 24 chapters of Stephen Hero and all but the final story of Dubliners. But he was unable to get Dubliners in press. Though the London publisher Grant Richards had contracted with Joyce to publish it, the printers were unwilling to print passages they found controversial because English law could hold them liable if they were brought to court for indecent language. Richards and Joyce went back and forth trying to find a solution where the book could avoid legal liability while preserving Joyce's sense of artistic integrity. As they continued to negotiate, Richards began to scrutinise the stories more carefully. He became concerned that the book might damage his publishing house's reputation and eventually backed down from his agreement.

Trieste was Joyce's main residence until 1920. Although he would temporarily leave the city—briefly staying in Rome, travelling to Dublin, and emigrating to Zürich during World War I— it became a second Dublin for him and played an important role in his development as a writer. He completed Dubliners, reworked Stephen Hero into A Portrait of the Artist as a Young Man, wrote his only published play Exiles, and decided to make Ulysses a full-length novel as he created his notes and jottings for the work. He worked out the characters of Leopold and Molly Bloom in Trieste. Many of the novel's details were taken from Joyce's observation of the city and its people, and some of its stylistic innovations appear to have been influenced by Futurism. There are even words of the Triestine dialect in Finnegans Wake.

1906–1915: Rome, Trieste, and sojourns to Dublin

Rome

In late May 1906, the head of the Berlitz school ran away after embezzling its funds. Artifoni took over the school but let Joyce know that he could only afford to keep one brother on. Tired of Trieste and discouraged that he could not get a publisher for Dubliners, Joyce found an advertisement for a correspondence clerk in a Roman bank that paid twice his current salary. He was hired for the position, and went to Rome at the end of July.

Joyce felt he accomplished very little during his brief stay in Rome, but it had a large impact on his writing. Though his new job took up most of his time, he revised the Dubliners and worked on Stephen Hero. Rome was the birthplace of the idea for "The Dead", which would become the final story of Dubliners, and for Ulysses, which was originally conceived as a short story. His stay in the city was one of his inspirations for Exiles. While there, he read the socialist historian Guglielmo Ferrero in depth. Ferrero's anti-heroic interpretations of history, arguments against militarism, and conflicted attitudes toward Jews would find their way into Ulysses, particularly in the character of Leopold Bloom. In London, Elkin Mathews published Chamber Music on the recommendation of the British poet Arthur Symons. Nonetheless, Joyce was dissatisfied with his job, had exhausted his finances, and realised he would need additional support when he learned Nora was pregnant again. He left Rome after only seven months.

Second stay in Trieste

Joyce returned to Trieste in March 1907, but was unable to find full-time work. He went back to being an English instructor, working part time for Berlitz and giving private lessons. The author Ettore Schmitz, better known by pen name Italo Svevo, was one of his students. Svevo was a Catholic of Jewish origin who became one of the models for Leopold Bloom. Joyce learned much of what he knew about Judaism from him. The two became lasting friends and mutual critics. Svevo supported Joyce's identity as an author, helping him work through his writer's block with A Portrait of the Artist as a Young Man. Roberto Prezioso, editor of the Italian newspaper Piccolo della Sera, was another of Joyce's students. He helped Joyce financially by commissioning him to write for the newspaper. Joyce quickly produced three articles aimed toward the Italian irredentists in Trieste. He indirectly paralleled their desire for independence from Austria-Hungary with the struggle of the Irish from British rule. Joyce earned additional money by giving a series of lectures on Ireland and the arts at
Trieste's Università Popolare. In May, Joyce was struck by an attack of rheumatic fever, which left him incapacitated for weeks. The illness exacerbated eye problems that plagued him for the rest of his life. While Joyce was still recovering from the attack, Lucia was born on 26 July 1907. During his convalescence, he was able to finish "The Dead", the last story of Dubliners.

Although a heavy drinker, Joyce gave up alcohol for a period in 1908. He reworked Stephen Hero as the more concise and interior A Portrait of the Artist as a Young Man. He completed the third chapter by April and translated John Millington Synge's Riders to the Sea into Italian with the help of Nicolò Vidacovich. He even took singing lessons again. Joyce had been looking for an English publisher for Dubliners but was unable to find one, so he submitted it to a Dublin publisher, Maunsel and Company, owned by George Roberts.

Visits to Dublin

In July 1909, Joyce received a year's advance payment from one of his students and returned to Ireland to introduce Giorgio to both sides of the family (his own in Dublin and Nora's in Galway). He unsuccessfully applied for the position of Chair of Italian at his alma mater, which had become University College Dublin. He met with Roberts, who seemed positive about publishing the Dubliners. He returned to Trieste in September with his sister Eva, who helped Nora run the home. Joyce only stayed in Trieste for a month, as he almost immediately came upon the idea of starting a cinema in Dublin, which unlike Trieste had none. He quickly got the backing of some Triestine business men and returned to Dublin in October, launching Ireland's first cinema, the Volta Cinematograph. It was initially well-received, but fell apart after Joyce left. He returned to Trieste in January 1910 with another sister, Eileen.

From 1910 to 1912, Joyce still lacked a reliable income. This brought his conflicts with Stanislaus, who was frustrated with lending him money, to their peak. In 1912, Joyce once more lectured at the Università Popolare on various topics in English literature and applied for a teaching diploma in English at the University of Padua. He performed very well on the qualification tests, but was denied because Italy did not recognise his degree from an Irish university. In 1912, Joyce and his family returned to Dublin briefly in the summer. While there, his three-year-long struggle with Roberts over the publication of Dubliners came to an end as Roberts refused to publish the book due to concerns of libel. Roberts had the printed sheets destroyed, though Joyce was able to obtain a copy of the proof sheets. When Joyce returned to Trieste, he wrote an invective against Roberts, "Gas from a Burner". He never went to Dublin again.

Publication of Dubliners and A Portrait 
Joyce's fortunes changed for the better in 1913 when Richards agreed to publish Dubliners. It was issued on 15 June 1914, eight and a half years since Joyce had first submitted it to him. Around the same time, he found an unexpected advocate in Ezra Pound, who was living in London. On the advice of Yeats, Pound wrote to Joyce asking if he could include a poem from Chamber Music, "I Hear an Army Charging upon the Land" in the journal Des Imagistes. They struck up a correspondence that lasted until the late 1930s. Pound became Joyce's promoter, helping ensure that Joyce's works were both published and publicized.

After Pound persuaded Dora Marsden to serially publish A Portrait of the Artist as a Young Man in the London literary magazine The Egoist, Joyce's pace of writing increased. He completed A Portrait of the Artist as a Young Man by 1914; resumed Exiles, completing it in 1915; started the novelette Giacomo Joyce, which he eventually abandoned; and began drafting Ulysses.

In August 1914, World War I broke out. Although Joyce and Stanislaus were subjects of the United Kingdom, which was now at war with Austria-Hungary, they remained in Trieste. Even when Stanislaus, who had publicly expressed his sympathy for the Triestine irredentists, was interned at the beginning of January 1915, Joyce chose to stay. In May 1915, Italy declared war on Austria-Hungary, and less than a month later Joyce took his family to Zürich in neutral Switzerland.

1915–1920: Zürich and Trieste

Zürich

Joyce arrived in Zürich as a double exile: he was an Irishman with a British passport and a Triestine on parole from Austria-Hungary. To get to Switzerland, he had to promise the Austro-Hungarian officials that he would not help the Allies during the war, and he and his family had to leave almost all of their possessions in Trieste. During the war, he was kept under surveillance by both the British and Austro-Hungarian secret services.

Joyce's first concern was earning a living. One of Nora's relatives sent them a small sum to cover the first few months. Pound and Yeats worked with the British government to provide a stipend from the Royal Literary Fund in 1915 and a grant from the British civil list the following year. Eventually, Joyce received large regular sums from the editor Harriet Shaw Weaver, who operated The Egoist, and the psychotherapist Edith Rockefeller McCormick, who lived in Zürich studying under Carl Jung. Weaver financially supported Joyce throughout the entirety of his life and even paid for his funeral. Between 1917 and the beginning of 1919, Joyce was financially secure and lived quite well; the family sometimes stayed in Locarno in the Italian-speaking region of Switzerland. However, health problems remained a constant issue. During their time in Zürich, both Joyce and Nora suffered illnesses that were diagnosed as "nervous breakdowns" and he had to undergo many eye surgeries.

Ulysses
During the war, Zürich was the centre of a vibrant expatriate community. Joyce's regular evening hangout was the Cafe Pfauen, where he got to know a number of the artists living in the city at the time, including the sculptor August Suter and the painter Frank Budgen. He often used the time spent with them as material for Ulysses. He made the acquaintance of the writer Stefan Zweig, who organised the premiere of Exiles in Munich in August 1919. He became aware of Dada, which was coming into its own at the Cabaret Voltaire. He may have even met the Marxist theoretician and revolutionary Vladimir Lenin at the Cafe Odeon, a place they both frequented.

Joyce kept up his interest in music. He met Ferruccio Busoni, staged music with Otto Luening, and learned music theory from Philipp Jarnach. Much of what Joyce learned about musical notation and counterpoint found its way into Ulysses, particularly the "Sirens" section.

Joyce avoided public discussion of the war's politics and maintained a strict neutrality. He made few comments about the 1916 Easter Rising in Ireland; although he was sympathetic to the Irish independence movement, he disagreed with its violence. He stayed intently focused on Ulysses
and the ongoing struggle to get his work published. Some of the serial instalments of "The Portrait of the Artist as a Young Man" in The Egoist had been censored by the printers, but the entire novel was published by B. W. Huebsch in 1916. In 1918, Pound got a commitment from Margaret Caroline Anderson, the owner and editor of the New York-based literary magazine The Little Review, to publish Ulysses serially.

The English Players

Joyce co-founded an acting company, the English Players, and became its business manager. The company was pitched to the British government as a contribution to the war effort, and mainly staged works by Irish playwrights, such as Oscar Wilde, George Bernard Shaw, and John Millington Synge. For Synge's Riders to the Sea, Nora played a principal role and Joyce sang offstage, which he did again when Robert Browning's In a Balcony was staged. He hoped the company would eventually stage his play, Exiles, but his participation in the English Players declined in the wake of the Great Influenza epidemic of 1918, though the company continued until 1920.

Joyce's work with the English Players involved him in a lawsuit. Henry Wilfred Carr, a wounded war veteran and British consul, accused Joyce of underpaying him for his role in The Importance of Being Earnest. Carr sued for compensation; Joyce countersued for libel. The cases were resolved in 1919, with Joyce winning the compensation case but losing the one for libel. The incident ended up creating acrimony between the British consulate and Joyce for the rest of his time in Zürich.

Third stay in Trieste
By 1919, Joyce was in financial straits again. McCormick stopped paying her stipend, partly because he refused to submit to psychoanalysis from Jung, and Zürich had become expensive to live in after the war. Furthermore, he was becoming isolated as the city's emigres returned home. In October 1919, Joyce's family moved back to Trieste, but it had changed. The Austro-Hungarian empire had ceased to exist, and Trieste was now an Italian city in post-war recovery. Eight months after his return, Joyce went to Sirmione, Italy, to meet Pound, who made arrangements for him to move to Paris. Joyce and his family packed their belongings and headed for Paris in June 1920.

1920–1941: Paris and Zürich

Paris

When Joyce and his family arrived in Paris in July 1920, their visit was intended to be a layover on their way to London. Beach quickly became an important person in Joyce's life, providing financial support, and becoming one of Joyce's publishers. Through Beach and Pound, Joyce quickly joined the intellectual circle of Paris and was integrated into the international modernist artist community. Joyce met Valery Larbaud, who championed Joyce's works to the French and supervised the French translation of Ulysses. Paris became the Joyces' regular residence for twenty years, though they never settled into a single location for long.

Publication of Ulysses
Joyce finished writing Ulysses near the end of 1921, but had difficulties getting it published. With financial backing from the lawyer John Quinn, Margaret Anderson and her co-editor Jane Heap had begun serially publishing it in The Little Review in March 1918 but in January and May 1919, two instalments were suppressed as obscene and potentially subversive. In September 1920, an unsolicited instalment of the "Nausicaa" episode was sent to the daughter of a New York attorney associated with the New York Society for the Suppression of Vice, leading to an official complaint. The trial proceedings continued until February 1921, when both Anderson and Healy, defended by Quinn, were fined $50 each for publishing obscenity and ordered to cease publishing Ulysses. Huebsch, who had expressed interest in publishing the novel in the United States, decided against it after the trial.
Weaver was unable to find an English printer, and the novel was banned for obscenity in the United Kingdom in 1922, where it was blacklisted until 1936.

Almost immediately after Anderson and Healy were ordered to stop printing Ulysses, Beach agreed to publish it through her bookshop. She had books mailed to people in Paris and the United States who had subscribed to get a copy; Weaver mailed books from Beach's plates to subscribers in England. Soon, the postal officials of both countries began confiscating the books. They were then smuggled into both countries. Because the work had no copyright in the United States at this time, "bootleg" versions appeared, including pirate versions from publisher Samuel Roth, who only ceased his actions in 1928 when a court enjoined publication. Ulysses was not legally published in the United States until 1934 after Judge John M. Woolsey ruled in United States v. One Book Called Ulysses that the book was not obscene.

Finnegans Wake
In 1923, Joyce began his next work, an experimental novel that eventually became Finnegans Wake. It would take sixteen years to complete. At first, Joyce called it Work in Progress, which was the name Ford Madox Ford used in April 1924 when he published its "Mamalujo" episode in his magazine, The Transatlantic Review. In 1926, Eugene and Maria Jolas serialised the novel in their magazine, transition. When parts of the novel first came out, some of Joyce's supporters—like Stanislaus, Pound, and Weaver— wrote negatively about it, and it was criticised by writers like Seán Ó Faoláin, Wyndham Lewis, and Rebecca West. In response, Joyce and the Jolas organised the publication of a collection of positive essays titled Our Exagmination Round His Factification for Incamination of Work in Progress, which included writings by Samuel Beckett and William Carlos Williams. An additional purpose of publishing these essays was to market Work in Progress to a larger audience. Joyce publicly revealed the novel's title as Finnegans Wake in 1939, the same year he completed it. It was published in London by Faber and Faber with the assistance of T. S. Eliot.

Joyce's health problems afflicted him throughout his Paris years. He had over a dozen eye operations, but his vision severely declined. By 1930, he was practically blind in the left eye and his right eye functioned poorly. He even had all of his teeth removed because of infection. At one point, Joyce became worried that he could not finish Finnegans Wake, asking the Irish author James Stephens to complete it if something should happen.

His financial problems continued. Although he was now earning a good income from his investments and royalties, his spending habits often left him without available money. Despite these issues, he published Pomes Penyeach in 1927, a collection of thirteen poems he wrote in Trieste, Zürich and Paris.

Marriage in London

In 1930, Joyce began thinking of establishing a residence in London once more, primarily to assure that Giorgio, who had just married Helen Fleischmann, would have his inheritance secured under British law. Joyce moved to London, obtained a long-term lease on a flat, registered on the electoral roll, and became liable for jury service. After living together for twenty-seven years, Joyce and Nora got married at the Register Office in Kensington on 4 July 1931. Joyce stayed in London for at least six months to establish his residency, but abandoned his flat and returned to Paris later in the year when Lucia showed signs of mental illness. He planned to return, but never did and later became disaffected with England.

In later years, Joyce lived in Paris but frequently travelled to Switzerland for eye surgery or for treatment for Lucia, who was diagnosed with schizophrenia. Lucia was analysed by Carl Jung, who had previously written that Ulysses was similar to schizophrenic writing. Jung suggested that she and her father were two people going into a river, except that Joyce was diving and Lucia was falling. In spite of Joyce's attempts to help Lucia, she remained permanently institutionalised after his death.

Final return to Zürich
In the late 1930s, Joyce became increasingly concerned about the rise of fascism and antisemitism. As early as 1938, Joyce was involved in helping a number of Jews escape Nazi persecution. After the fall of France in 1940, Joyce and his family fled from Nazi occupation, returning to Zürich a final time.

Death

On 11 January 1941, Joyce underwent surgery in Zürich for a perforated duodenal ulcer. He fell into a coma the following day. He awoke at 2 am on 13 January 1941, and asked a nurse to call his wife and son. They were en route when he died 15 minutes later, less than a month before his 59th birthday.

His body was buried in the Fluntern Cemetery in Zürich. Swiss tenor Max Meili sang "Addio terra, addio cielo" from Monteverdi's L'Orfeo at the burial service. Joyce had been a subject of the United Kingdom all his life and only the British consul attended the funeral. Although two senior Irish diplomats were in Switzerland at the time, neither attended Joyce's funeral. When Joseph Walshe, secretary at the Department of External Affairs in Dublin, was informed of Joyce's death by Frank Cremins, chargé d'affaires at Bern, Walshe responded, "Please wire details of Joyce's death. If possible find out did he die a Catholic? Express sympathy with Mrs Joyce and explain inability to attend funeral." Buried originally in an ordinary grave, Joyce was moved in 1966 to a more prominent "honour grave", with a seated portrait statue by American artist Milton Hebald nearby. Nora, whom he had married in 1931, survived him by 10 years. She is buried by his side, as is their son Giorgio, who died in 1976.

After Joyce's death, the Irish government declined Nora's request to permit the repatriation of Joyce's remains, despite being persistently lobbied by the American diplomat John J. Slocum. In October 2019, a motion was put to Dublin City Council to plan and budget for the costs of the exhumations and reburials of Joyce and his family somewhere in Dublin, subject to his family's wishes. The proposal immediately became controversial, with the Irish Times commenting: "... it is hard not to suspect that there is a calculating, even mercantile, aspect to contemporary Ireland's relationship to its great writers, whom we are often more keen to 'celebrate', and if possible monetise, than read".

Joyce and politics

Throughout his life, Joyce stayed actively interested in Irish national politics and in its relationship to British colonialism. He studied socialism and anarchism. He attended socialist meetings and expressed an individualist view influenced by Benjamin Tucker's philosophy and Oscar Wilde's essay "The Soul of Man Under Socialism". He described his opinions as "those of a socialist artist". Joyce's direct engagement in politics was strongest during his time in Trieste, when he submitted newspaper articles, gave lectures, and wrote letters advocating for Ireland's independence from British rule. After leaving Trieste, Joyce's direct involvement in politics waned, 
but his later works still reflect his commitment. He remained sympathetic to individualism and critical toward coercive ideologies such as nationalism. His novels address socialist, anarchist and Irish nationalist issues. Ulysses has been read as a novel critiquing the effect of English colonialism on the Irish people. Finnegans Wake has been read as a work that investigates the divisive issues of Irish politics, the interrelationship between colonialism and race, and the coercive oppression of nationalism and fascism.

Joyce's politics is reflected in his attitude toward his British passport. He wrote about the negative effects of English occupation in Ireland and was sympathetic to the attempts of the Irish to free themselves from it. In 1907, he expressed his support for the early Sinn Féin movement before Irish independence. However, throughout his life, Joyce refused to exchange his British passport for an Irish one. When he had a choice, he opted to renew his British passport in 1935 instead of obtaining one from the Irish Free State, and he chose to keep it in 1940 when accepting an Irish passport could have helped him to more easily leave Vichy France. His refusal to change his passport was partly due to the advantages that a British passport gave him internationally, his being out of sympathy with the violence of Irish politics, and his dismay with the Irish Free State's political relationship with the church.

Joyce and religion

Joyce had a complex relationship with religion. Early in life, he lapsed from Roman Catholicism. First-hand statements by himself, Stanislaus and Nora attest that he did not consider himself a Catholic. Nevertheless, his work is deeply influenced by Catholicism. In particular, his intellectual foundations were grounded in his early Jesuitical education. Even after he left Ireland, he sometimes went to church. When living in Trieste, he woke up early to attend Catholic Mass on Holy Thursday and Good Friday or occasionally attended Eastern Orthodox services, stating that he liked the ceremonies better.

A number of Catholic critics suggest that Joyce never fully abandoned his faith, wrestling with it in his writings and becoming increasingly reconciled with it. They argue that Ulysses and Finnegans Wake are expressions of a Catholic sensibility, insisting that the critical views of religion expressed by Stephen, the protagonist of A Portrait of the Artist as a Young Man and Ulysses, do not represent the views of Joyce the author.

Joyce's attitude toward Catholicism has been described as an enigma in which there are two Joyces: a modern one who resisted Catholic tradition and another who maintained his allegiance to it. It has alternatively been described as a dialectic that is both affirming and denying. For example, Stephen Dedalus's statement in A Portrait of the Artist as a Young Man " (I will not serve)" is qualified—"I will not serve that which I no longer believe", and that the non-serviam will always be balanced by Stephen's "I am... [a] servant too" and the "yes" of Molly Bloom's final soliloquy in Ulysses. 
Some critics have suggested that Joyce's apparent apostasy was less a denial of faith than a transmutation, a criticism of the Church's adverse impact on spiritual life and personal development. He has been compared to the medieval  [wandering bishops], who left their discipline but not their cultural heritage of thought.

Joyce's own responses to questions about his faith were often ambiguous. For example, during an interview after the completion of Ulysses, Joyce was asked, "When did you leave the Catholic Church?" He answered, "That's for the Church to say."

Major works

Dubliners

Dubliners is a collection of 15 short stories first published in 1914, that form a naturalistic depiction of Irish middle-class life in and around the city in the early 20th century. The tales were written when Irish nationalism and the search for national identity was at its peak. Joyce holds up a mirror to that identity as a first step in the spiritual liberation of Ireland. The stories centre on Joyce's idea of an epiphany: a moment when a character experiences a life-changing self-understanding or illumination. Many of the characters in Dubliners later appear in minor roles in Joyce's novel Ulysses. The initial stories are narrated by child protagonists. Later stories deal with the lives and concerns of progressively older people. This aligns with Joyce's tripartite division of the collection into childhood, adolescence, and maturity.

A Portrait of the Artist as a Young Man

A Portrait of the Artist as a Young Man, published in 1916, is a shortened rewrite of the abandoned novel Stephen Hero. It is a Künstlerroman, a kind of coming-of-age novel depicting the childhood and adolescence of the protagonist Stephen Dedalus and his gradual growth into artistic self-consciousness. It functions both as an autobiographical fiction of the author and a biography of the fictional protagonist. Some hints of the techniques Joyce frequently employed in later works, such as stream of consciousness, interior monologue, and references to a character's psychic reality rather than to his external surroundings are evident throughout this novel.

Exiles and poetry

Despite early interest in the theatre, Joyce published only one play, Exiles, begun shortly after the outbreak of the First World War in 1914 and published in 1918. A study of a husband-and-wife relationship, the play looks back to "The Dead" (the final story in Dubliners) and forward to Ulysses, which Joyce began around the time of the play's composition.

He published three books of poetry. The first full-length collection was Chamber Music (1907), which consisted of 36 short lyrics. It led to his inclusion in the Imagist Anthology, edited by Ezra Pound, a champion of Joyce's work. Other poetry Joyce published in his lifetime includes "Gas from a Burner" (1912), Pomes Penyeach (1927), and "Ecce Puer" (written in 1932 to mark the birth of his grandson and the recent death of his father). These were published by the Black Sun Press in Collected Poems (1936).

Ulysses

The action of Ulysses starts on 16 June 1904 at 8am and ends sometime after 2am the following morning. Much of it occurs inside the minds of the characters, who are portrayed through techniques such as interior monologue, dialogue, and soliloquy. The novel consists of 18 episodes, each covering roughly one hour of the day using a unique literary style. Joyce structured each chapter to refer to an individual episode in Homer's Odyssey, as well as a specific colour, a particular art or science, and a bodily organ. Ulysses sets the characters and incidents of Homer's Odyssey in 1904 Dublin, representing Odysseus (Ulysses), Penelope, and Telemachus in the characters of Leopold Bloom, his wife Molly Bloom, and Stephen Dedalus. It uses humor, including parody, satire and comedy, to contrast the novel's characters with their Homeric models. Joyce played down the mythic correspondences by eliminating the chapter titles so the work could be read independently of its Homeric structure.

Ulysses can be read as a study of Dublin in 1904, exploring various aspects of the city's life, dwelling on its squalor and monotony. Joyce claimed that if Dublin were to be destroyed in some catastrophe, it could be rebuilt using his work as a model. To achieve this sense of detail, he relied on his memory, what he heard other people remember, and his readings to create a sense of fastidious detail. Joyce regularly used the 1904 edition of Thom's Directory—a work that listed the owners and tenants of every residential and commercial property in the city—to ensure his descriptions were accurate. This combination of kaleidoscopic writing, reliance on a formal schema to structure the narrative, and an exquisite attention to detail represents one of the book's major contributions to the development of 20th-century modernist literature.

Finnegans Wake

Finnegans Wake is an experimental novel that pushes stream of consciousness and literary allusions to their extremes. Although the work can be read from beginning to end, Joyce's writing transforms traditional ideas of plot and character development through his wordplay, allowing the book to be read nonlinearly. Much of the word play stems from the work being written in a peculiar and obscure English, based mainly on complex multilevel puns. This approach is similar to, but far more extensive than, that used by Lewis Carroll in Jabberwocky and draws on a wide range of languages. The associative nature of its language has led to it being interpreted as the story of a dream.

The metaphysics of Giordano Bruno of Nola, who Joyce had read in his youth, plays an important role in Finnegans Wake, as it provides the framework for how the identities of the characters interplay and are transformed. Giambattista Vico's cyclical view of history (in which civilisation rises from chaos, passes through theocratic, aristocratic, and democratic phases, and then lapses back into chaos) structures the text's narrative, as evidenced by the opening and closing words of the book: Finnegans Wake opens with the words "riverrun, past Eve and Adam's, from swerve of shore to bend of bay, brings us by a commodius vicus of recirculation back to Howth Castle and Environs" and ends "A way a lone a last a loved a long the". In other words, the book ends with the beginning of a sentence and begins with the end of the same sentence, turning the narrative into one great cycle.

Legacy

Joyce's work still has a profound influence on contemporary culture. Ulysses is a model for fiction writers, particularly its explorations in the power of language. Its emphasis on the details of everyday life have opened up new possibilities of expression for authors, painters and film-makers. It retains its prestige among readers, often ranking high on 'Great Book' lists. Joyce's innovations extend beyond English literature: his writing has been an inspiration for Latin American writers, and Finnegans Wake has become one of the key texts for French post-structuralism. It also provided the name for the quark, one of the elementary particles proposed by physicist Murray Gell-Mann.

The open-ended form of Joyce's novels keep them open to constant reinterpretation. They inspire an increasingly global community of literary critics. Joyce studies—based on a relatively small canon of three novels, a small short story collection, one play, and two small books of poems—have generated over 15,000 articles, monographs, theses, translations, and editions.

In popular culture, the work and life of Joyce is celebrated annually on 16 June, known as Bloomsday, in Dublin and in an increasing number of cities worldwide.

Museums and study centres
The National Library of Ireland holds a large collection of Joycean material including manuscripts and notebooks, much of it available online. A joint venture between the library and University College Dublin, the Museum of Literature Ireland (branded MoLI in homage to Molly Bloom), the majority of whose exhibits are about Joyce and his work, has both a small permanent Joyce-related collection, and borrows from its parent institutions; its displays include "Copy No. 1" of Ulysses. Dedicated centres in Dublin include the James Joyce Centre in North Great George's Street, the James Joyce Tower and Museum in Sandycove (the Martello tower where Joyce once lived, and the setting for the opening scene in Ulysses), and the Dublin Writers Museum. University College London holds the only major research collection of Joyce's work in the United Kingdom, including first editions of all of Joyce’s major works, most other early and later editions (including translations), as well as critical and background literature.

Bibliography

Prose
 Dubliners (short-story collection, 1914)
 A Portrait of the Artist as a Young Man (novel, 1916)
 Ulysses (novel, 1922)
 Finnegans Wake (novel, 1939, restored 2012)

Posthumous publications and drafts

Fiction
 Stephen Hero (precursor to A Portrait; written 1904–06, published 1944)
 The Cat and the Devil (London: Faber and Faber, 1965)
 The Cats of Copenhagen (Ithys Press, 2012)
 Finn's Hotel (Ithys Press, 2013)

Non-Fiction
 The Critical Writings of James Joyce (Eds. Ellsworth Mason and Richard Ellmann, 1959)
 Letters of James Joyce Vol. 1 (Ed. Stuart Gilbert, 1957)
 Letters of James Joyce Vol. 2 (Ed. Richard Ellmann, 1966)
 Letters of James Joyce Vol. 3 (Ed. Richard Ellmann, 1966)
 Selected Letters of James Joyce (Ed. Richard Ellmann, 1975)

Poetry collections
 Chamber Music (poems, Elkin Mathews, 1907)
 Giacomo Joyce (written 1907, published by Faber and Faber, 1968)
 Pomes Penyeach (poems, Shakespeare and Company, 1927)
 Collected Poems (poems, Black Sun Press, 1936, which includes Chamber Music, Pomes Penyeach and other previously published works)

Play
 Exiles (play, 1918)

Notes

References
Citations

Sources
Books

 
 
 
 
 
 
 
 
 
 
 
 
 
 
 
 
 
 
 
 
 
 
 
 
 
 
 
 
 
  
 
 
 
 
 
 
 
 
 
 
 
 
 
 
 
 
 }
 
 
 
 
 
 
 
 
 
 
 
  
  
 
 
 
 
 
 * 
  
 
 
 }
 
 
 
 
 
 
 
 
 
 
 
 
 
 
 
 
 
 

Journal articles

 
 
 
 
 
 
 
 
 
 
 
 
 
 
 
 
 
 
 
 
 
 
 
 
 
 
 
 
 
 
 
 
 
 
 
 
 
 
 
 
 
 
 
 
 
 
 
 
 
 
 
 
 
 
 
 
 
 
 
 
 
  
 
 
 
 
 
 
 
 
 
 
 
 
 
 
 
 
 
 
 
 
 
 
 

Online sources

 
 
 
 
 
 
 
 
 
 
 
 
 
 
 
 
 
 
 
 

Primary sources

 
 
 
  
 
 
 
 
 
  Gorman's biography was substantially edited by Joyce; see Nadel, 1991 and Witemeyer, 1995 cited above.
  
 
 
 
  
 
 
 
 
 
 
 
 
 
 

Literary works

Further viewing

External links

Joyce Papers, National Library of Ireland
 The Joyce Papers 2002, c. 1903–1928
 The James Joyce – Paul Léon Papers, 1930–1940
 Hans E. Jahnke Bequest at the Zurich James Joyce Foundation online at the National Library Of Ireland, 2014
 James Joyce by Djuna Barnes: Vanity Fair, March, 1922

Electronic editions
 
 
 
 

Resources
 James Joyce Collection at University College London
 
 The James Joyce Scholars' Collection from the University of Wisconsin Digital Collections Center
 James Joyce from Dublin to Ithaca Exhibition from the collections of Cornell University
 Bibliography of Joycean Scholarship, Articles and Literary Criticism

 
1882 births
1941 deaths
20th-century Irish dramatists and playwrights
20th-century Irish journalists
20th-century Irish male writers
20th-century Irish non-fiction writers
20th-century Irish novelists
20th-century Irish poets
20th-century Irish short story writers
20th-century letter writers
Alumni of University College Dublin
Burials at Fluntern Cemetery
Deaths from ulcers
Humor researchers
Individualist anarchists
Irish anarchists
Irish expatriates in Austria-Hungary
Irish expatriates in Croatia
Irish expatriates in France
Irish expatriates in Italy
Irish expatriates in Switzerland
Irish humorous poets
Irish journalists
Irish literary critics
Irish male dramatists and playwrights
Irish male novelists
Irish male short story writers
Irish male poets
Irish satirists
Irish socialists
Irish tenors
Irony theorists
Literary theorists
Metaphor theorists
Modernism
Modernist writers
Neologists
People educated at Belvedere College
People educated at Clongowes Wood College
People educated at O'Connell School
People from Rathgar
People from Rathmines
Surrealist writers
Trope theorists
Writers of historical fiction set in the modern age